The Hundred of Blyth refers to a cadastral unit (land division). It may refer to:
 Hundred of Blyth (Northern Territory)
 Hundred of Blyth (South Australia)